The Hairy Man is a Russian fairy tale. Andrew Lang included it in The Crimson Fairy Book.

Synopsis
Two ricks of a king's rapeseed fields are burned every night. Finally, a shepherd with dogs keeps watch, and catches the "Hairy Man" who is responsible. The King puts him in a cage. The Hairy Man pleads with the King's son so earnestly that the young prince frees him. For this, the King orders that his son be taken to the forest and killed, and that his lungs and liver be brought back as proof. The man who takes him can not do it and kills an old sick dog instead.

The boy wanders the forest. Years later, he comes upon a cottage, where the Hairy Man lives. There he stays for seven years, working hard like a peasant, but never complaining until he is old enough to travel on. Before he leaves, the Hairy Man gives the boy a golden apple (which magically contains a golden staff and a golden-maned horse), a silver apple (which contains a silver staff and an army of hussars), and a copper apple (which contains a copper staff and an army of foot soldiers). The boy uses the first apple, and embarks on his journey, finally pledging his service to a distant king.

One day, the king (who only has a small army) is threatened by a very powerful king. The boy uses his second magic apple to provide reinforcements for his king. The king's youngest princess gives him a ring, and he carries it and half of a handkerchief his sister gave him into battle. The prince's men defeat the enemy so thoroughly that only two survivors are deliberately permitted to escape as messengers to the king who sent them. The prince falls in love with the youngest princess and he gives her the copper apple. The princess has already discovered who he really is after having his room searched, which turned up the half handkerchief. When the king learns that he is a prince as well as a brave and honorable hero, the king is more than happy to allow him to marry his youngest daughter.

Variants
This tale is known throughout Europe, in such variants as Iron John, Georgic and Merlin, and Guerrino and the Savage Man.  A more widespread variant, found in Europe, Asia, and Africa, opens with the prince for some reason being the servant of an evil being, where he gains the same gifts, and the tale proceeds as in this variant; one such tale is The Magician's Horse.

See also
 Iron John
 Little Johnny Sheep-Dung
 Snow White
 The Gold-bearded Man
 The Water of Life
 Water and Salt

References

Hairy Man